David Roderick (October 29, 1921 – December 4, 2007) was an American politician and attorney who spent four years in the Washington State legislature.

Early life
Born in Frederick, Maryland, Roderick moved with his family at a young age to Seattle, Washington. He attended Broadway Central High School, where he was friends with many students who became victims of the internment of Japanese Americans. Roderick fought in World War II as a U.S. Navy pilot in the Pacific Theater, and then returned home to Washington, where he graduated from the University of Washington in 1947.

Politics
In 1948, Roderick successfully ran for the Washington House of Representatives as a Democrat, and served two terms while also attending the University of Washington Law School. While in law school, he became friends with future federal judge Jack Edward Tanner. During and after his stint in the legislature, he was active in the labor and civil rights movements. Roderick worked as a labor arbitrator on the Seattle waterfront, and marched with Martin Luther King Jr. for African-American voting rights in 1960. In 1960, Roderick worked for the presidential campaign of John F. Kennedy. He moved to Kingston, Washington, and ran for the legislature again during the 1968 elections, but was defeated by the Republican candidate.

Later life
Roderick moved to Anchorage, Alaska, in 1971, where he was the campaign manager for his brother John "Jack" Roderick's successful run for mayor of Anchorage in 1974. He worked as an attorney in Alaska until his retirement in 1995, when he returned to Tacoma, Washington.

Personal life
Roderick married his first wife, Jean, in 1948, and they had three children; the couple divorced in 1958. He remarried in 1961 to Marcia, and the marriage led to two additional children, Susan and John Roderick, who became a noted musician and podcaster. David and Marcia Roderick divorced in 1974.

References

1921 births
2007 deaths
Democratic Party members of the Washington House of Representatives
20th-century American politicians
20th-century American lawyers
University of Washington College of Arts and Sciences alumni
University of Washington School of Law alumni
United States Navy pilots of World War II